Trouble in Mind may refer to:

Music 
 "Trouble in Mind" (song), a 1924 song by Richard M. Jones
 Trouble in Mind (George Jones album), 1966
 Trouble in Mind (Archie Shepp album), 1980
 Trouble in Mind (Big Bill Broonzy album), 2000
 Trouble in Mind (Elkie Brooks and Humphrey Lyttelton album), 2003
 Trouble in Mind: Doc Watson Country Blues Collection, 2003 country album
 Trouble in Mind (Hayes Carll album), 2008
 Trouble in Mind (EP), 2015 extended play album by Lee Ann Womack
 Trouble in Mind (Jodie Marie album), 2015
 "Trouble in Mind", a 2016 song by Larkin Poe
 Trouble in Mind Records, an independent music label.

Other media 
 Trouble in Mind, 1955 drama by Alice Childress
 Trouble in Mind (film), 1985 neo-noir
 Trouble in Mind (TV series), 1991 television series starring Richard O'Sullivan
 Trouble in Mind: Black Southerners in the Age of Jim Crow, 1998 book by Leon F. Litwack